Arafundi may refer to:

Arafundi languages
Arafundi River